Guatimac or the Idol of Guatimac is an owl-shaped Guanche cult image, found in 1885, hidden in a cave between the municipalities of Fasnia and Güímar (Tenerife, Canary Islands, Spain) wrapped in goat hide.

Characteristics
The idol, made from fired clay, is incomplete, with two appendages missing from its head. It bears a hole next to its neck, presumably to pass a strap through and wear it as an amulet. This type of cult image was used by the aboriginal priestly castes of the Kankus, who were responsible with the worship of ancestor spirits, and the Guañameñes, the high priests. Along with Guatimac, numerous Guanche mummies were found at the cave in the midst of the 19th century.

Despite its small size, only about 6.4 centimeters in height, it is a figure of great anthropological value, since it is one of the few idols of prehistorical Tenerife that survived to the modern day. Today, the figurine can be seen at the Archaeological Museum of Puerto de la Cruz.

Interpretation

Although its exact meaning cannot be known for certain, it seems to be related to the religious world of the Guanches. It is believed by some that it represents a type of jinn or protective spirit, but others hold that it is an animal or sacred totem, possibly an owl.

Guatimac can be considered an asexual idol, that is to say, it is a human figure without distinguishing sexual characteristics. Other historians maintain the position that it represents and animal, perhaps an owl, and therefore classify it as a zoomorphic figurine (bearing the shape of an animal).

Guatimac represents a rarity within the idols of the Canary Islands, since it has no parallels within the rest of the remains of the extinct Guanche culture. However, rock carvings representing a certain type of evil Jinns, the Yenum or Jenun, have been found in desert caves within the Berber cultural zone of North Africa. The Berber tribes believe the Yenum to inhabit the interior of the earth and caves. Their representations bear striking resemblance to the idol of Guatimac. Since the Guanches are identified as Berbers themselves, originating from North Africa, the idol could represent a general idea that exists throughout the Berber cultural sphere. However, the fact that no similar figures has been found in the Canary Islands, or even around the island of Tenerife itself remains an enigma.

Despite this, according to different sources, other figurines have indeed been found in Tenerife, but whose whereabouts are currently unknown.

Description

One of the first historians to deal with the subject of the Guanche idols was the tinerfeño . He offers us this description of the idol's discovery and subsequent study:

References

External links
Las manifestaciones artísticas prehispánicas y su huella
Official site of the Museo Arqueológico del Puerto de La Cruz

Guanche
Archaeological artefact types
Archaeology of Tenerife
1885 archaeological discoveries
Cult images
Owls in culture
Clay
Birds in art